David Glass (July 20, 1829 – July 17, 1906) was a Canadian lawyer and political figure. He was a Conservative Member of Parliament representing Middlesex East from 1872 to 1874.

He was born in Westminster Township, Middlesex County, Upper Canada in 1829, the son of Samuel Glass, who had come to Upper Canada from Ireland in 1819, and Eliza Owrey. In 1856, he married Sarah Dalton. Glass was called to the bar in 1864 and set up practice in London. He served on London City Council and was mayor in 1858 and 1865–1866. In 1876, he was named Queen's Counsel. He moved to Winnipeg in 1882, was called to the Manitoba bar later that year and was elected to the Legislative Assembly of Manitoba for St. Clements in 1886, serving from 1887 to 1888; he was also Speaker of the Legislative Assembly from 1887 to 1888. He retired from politics in 1888 due to poor health. Glass was solicitor for the city of Winnipeg. He was also master of the local Masonic lodge and a member of the Grand Lodge of Canada.

He later lived in Rossland, British Columbia and Spokane, Washington, where he died in 1906. Glass was buried in London, Ontario.

References 

1829 births
1906 deaths
Mayors of London, Ontario
Conservative Party of Canada (1867–1942) MPs
Members of the House of Commons of Canada from Ontario
Speakers of the Legislative Assembly of Manitoba
People from Middlesex County, Ontario
Pre-Confederation Ontario people
Canadian King's Counsel